James Allister Jenkins (born 23 September 1923, Toronto, Ontario; – 16 September 2012, Lock Haven, Pennsylvania) was a Canadian–American mathematician, specializing in complex analysis.

Education and career
Jenkins moved from Toronto to the United States to attend graduate school in mathematics at Harvard University. There he received his PhD in 1948 with thesis Some Problems in Complex Analysis under the supervision Lars Ahlfors, one of the first two Fields laureates. After some time at Harvard as a postdoc, Jenkins taught and did research at Johns Hopkins University for several years. He became, by 1955, a professor at the University of Notre Dame and, by 1963, a professor at Washington University in St. Louis, where he eventually retired as professor emeritus. He spent several sabbaticals at the Institute for Advanced Study.

Jenkins was the author or coauthor of over 137 research publications in complex analysis. He coauthored 6 papers with Marston Morse.

In their 1953 paper in Fundamenta Mathematicae, "Morse and Jenkins solve the difficult problem of showing that on a simply connected Riemann surface every pseudo-harmonic function has a pseudo-conjugate. Thus in particular they show that on such a surface any pseudo-harmonic function can be made harmonic by a change of the conformai structure."

Morse and Jenkins basically settled "the simply connected case, where they extended and completed earlier work of Kaplan, Boothby and others ..." and then in their 1953 paper in the Proceedings of the National Academy of Sciences they discussed the same problems on doubly connected surfaces. "In particular they there give a very complete analysis of the structure of the level sets of a pseudo-harmonic function."

In 1962 Jenkins was an Invited Speaker at the International Congress of Mathematicians in Stockholm.

Selected publications

Articles

Books

References

20th-century American mathematicians
21st-century American mathematicians
20th-century Canadian mathematicians
21st-century Canadian mathematicians
Harvard University alumni
University of Notre Dame faculty
Washington University in St. Louis faculty
Complex analysts
1923 births
2012 deaths
Canadian emigrants to the United States